Black smoke or Black Smoke may refer to:
 Soot, which appears as black smoke
Black smoke (The War of the Worlds), a fictional alien weapon
Black Smoke (song), a 2015 German Eurovision entry
 Black Smoke Rising, an album by Greta Van Fleet
 Black Smoke Band, the creators of Jeff Wayne's Musical Version of The War of the Worlds
 Black Smoke Shen Long, a Dragon Ball character
 Black Smoke Monster, a monster from Lost